Thesleff is a surname. Notable people with the surname include:

Alexander Amatus Thesleff (1907–1983), Finnish diplomat and lawyer
Ellen Thesleff (1869-1954), Finnish painter
Irma Thesleff, Finnish biologist
Jan Thesleff (born 1959), Swedish diplomat
Rolf Thesleff (1878–1938), Finnish educator and diplomat
Wilhelm Alexander Thesleff (1880-1941), Finnish general